Annette Island School District is a school district headquartered in Metlakatla, Alaska, serving Annette Island Reserve, Alaska's only Indian reservation. As of the 2019–20 school year, it enrolls 310 students across three schools. Around 95% are American Indian or Alaska Native.

In 2007, Richard Johnson Elementary School was named a National Blue Ribbon School.

Schools
 Richard Johnson Elementary School (160 students), PK-5th
 Charles R. Leak Sr. Middle School (82 students), 6th-8th
 Metlakatla High School (68 students), 9th-12th

References

External links
 

School districts in Alaska
Prince of Wales–Hyder Census Area, Alaska
Education in Unorganized Borough, Alaska